Dead Ernest is a 1982 UK TV supernatural sitcom set in heaven starring Andrew Sachs in the role of Ernest Springer. It was broadcast on ITV from 15 February 1982 and was the first sitcom made by the newly formed Central Television.

Ernest wins half a million pounds on the football pools. Unfortunately he is killed by a blow to the head from a stray champagne bottle cork. He subsequently ascends to heaven. Although the authorities in heaven admit that his death was an administrative error (he had been scheduled to die in his bed in Lyme Regis in 2007), as his kidneys have already been donated he cannot go back down to earth.

The notion of a sitcom set in the afterlife was an intriguing one, but despite the original idea, some promising comic setpieces (Ernest encounters Beethoven and Bach in one episode), Sachs' undoubted comedic abilities, and support from other seasoned comic actors such as Ken Jones, it was regarded as a disappointing effort, and only lasted for one series of seven episodes.

References

External links

1982 British television series debuts
1982 British television series endings
1980s British sitcoms
British supernatural television shows
ITV sitcoms
Television series by Fremantle (company)
Television series by ITV Studios
Television shows produced by Central Independent Television
English-language television shows